Sphenomorphus nigriventris  is a species of skink. It is endemic to New Guinea and is found in both Papua New Guinea and Western New Guinea.

References

nigriventris
Endemic fauna of New Guinea
Reptiles of Western New Guinea
Reptiles of Papua New Guinea
Reptiles described in 1915
Taxa named by Nelly de Rooij
Skinks of New Guinea